Miquel Sàmper i Rodríguez (born 1966) is a Spanish lawyer and politician from Catalonia and, since 3 September 2020, Minister of the Interior of the Generalitat de Catalunya.

Career

He received a degree in Law and Political Science. Before he entered politics, he owned a law office in his hometown of Terrassa. He was Dean of the Bar Association of Terrace, President of the Catalan Lawyers and Deputy President of the General Council of Spanish Lawyers. He was also one of the promoters of the first Mortgage Brokerage Office in Spain.

In 2015, he was the CiU candidate for mayor of Terrassa and finished in fourth place with three councilors. After the elections, he and his party abstained during the mayoral election, thereby facilitating the election of Jordi Ballart, the PSC candidate, as mayor. Four years later, he ran for re-election, this time under the name of Junts per Terrassa. However, he ran as number two on the party list, giving the number one spot to the exiled councilor Lluís Puig. His party won two seats in that election.

On 3 September 2020, during a cabinet reshuffle, he was chosen by Catalan President Quim Torra to replace Miquel Buch as Minister of the Interior of the Generalitat de Catalunya.

References

1966 births
Convergence and Union politicians
Democratic Convergence of Catalonia politicians
Interior ministers of Catalonia
Living people
Together for Catalonia (2020) politicians
Torra Government